The sixth set of elections to Kesteven County Council were held on Thursday, 7 March 1901. Kesteven was one of three divisions of the historic county of Lincolnshire in England; it consisted of the ancient wapentakes (or hundreds) of Aswardhurn, Aveland, Beltisloe, Boothby Graffoe, Flaxwell, Langoe, Loveden, Ness, and Winnibriggs and Threo. The Local Government Act 1888 established Kesteven as an administrative county, governed by a Council; elections were held every three years from 1889, until it was abolished by the Local Government Act 1972, which established Lincolnshire County Council in its place.

Nearly every candidate was returned unopposed in the election, with contests in only seven of the 48 divisions. No party affiliation is recorded for any of the candidates, except those for Gonerby and Osbournby.

Results by division

Ancaster

Barrowby

Bassingham

Bennington

Billingborough

Billinghay

Bourne

Bracebridge

Branston

Bytham

Caythorpe

Claypole

Colsterworth

Corby

Deeping

Gonerby

Grantham no. 1

Grantham no. 2

Grantham no. 3

Grantham no. 4

Grantham no. 5

Grantham no. 6

Grantham no. 7

Heckington

Heighington

Helpringham

Kyme

N.B. It is not clear from the results reports who won this division.

Martin

Metheringham

Morton

Navenby

Osbournby

Ponton

Rippingale

Ropsley

Ruskington

Skellingthorpe

Sleaford East

Sleaford West

Stamford no. 1

Stamford no. 2

Stamford no. 3

Stamford no. 4

Thurlby

Uffington

Waddington

Wellingore

Wilsford

By-elections

Billinghay, 1901 
John Creasey, the sitting councillor of the Billinghay division, died on 30 October 1901. Three candidates emerged to fill the vacancy created by his death: John William Palmer, a merchant; John Edward South, a miller and merchant; and William Ravell, a farmer and auctioneer. The election was held on Friday, 6 December. According to the Grantham Journal, "all parties work[ed] hard for success"; canvassing was carried out in Billinghay and Walcott and Palmer and Ravell addressed voters in both villages in the week before the election.

The results were as follows:

Ravell was therefore returned as the councillor for the division.

References

Notes

Citations

1901
Kesteven
20th century in Lincolnshire
March 1901 events